Don King: Only in America is a 1997 American television film directed by John Herzfeld and written by Kario Salem (based on the book Only in America: The Life and Crimes of Don King by Jack Newfield). The film stars actor Ving Rhames as Don King and tells the story of King becoming a famous fight promoter and boxing manager.

Cast

Ving Rhames as Don King
Vondie Curtis-Hall as Lloyd Price
Jeremy Piven as Hank Schwartz
Darius McCrary as Muhammad Ali
Keith David as Jabir Herbert Muhammad
Bernie Mac as Bundini Brown
Gabriel Casseus as Jeremiah Shabazz
Ken Lerner as Bob Arum
Danny Johnson as Larry Holmes
Jarrod Bunch as George Foreman
Israel Cole as Joe Frazier
Kevin Grevioux as Leon Spinks
K.J. Penthouse as Chuck Wepner
James R. Black as Earnie Shavers
Michael Blanks as James "Buster" Douglas
Everton Davis as Evander Holyfield
Cliff Couser as Mike Tyson
Loretta Devine as Constance Harper
Ron Leibman as Harry Shondor

Awards and nominations
 1998 American Cinema Editors for Best Edited Two-Hour Film for Non-Commercial Television
 1998 Broadcast Film Critics Association for Best Television Film (won) 
1998 Emmy Award for Outstanding Directing for a Miniseries or a Movie – John Herzfeld (nominated)
1998 Emmy Award for Outstanding Made for Television Movie (won)
1998 Emmy Award for Outstanding Lead Actor in a Miniseries or a Movie - Ving Rhames (nominated)
1998 Emmy Award for Outstanding Writing for a Miniseries or a Movie – Kario Salem (won)
 1998 Emmy Award for Outstanding Casting for a Miniseries or a Movie - Robi Reed (nominated)
1998 Golden Globe Awards for Best Actor - Miniseries or Television Film – Ving Rhames (won)
 1998 Peabody Award
1998 Satellite Awards for Best Miniseries or Television Film
1998 Satellite Awards for Best Supporting Actor - Series, Miniseries or Television Film - Vondie Curtis-Hall

References

External links

1997 films
1997 television films
American boxing films
American biographical films
Peabody Award-winning broadcasts
Primetime Emmy Award for Outstanding Made for Television Movie winners
Films directed by John Herzfeld
Films scored by Anthony Marinelli
Cultural depictions of Muhammad Ali
HBO Films films
1990s English-language films
1990s American films